Franay was a French coachbuilder of renown operating at Levallois-Perret, a suburb on the prosperous north-western edge of Paris.   The company was founded in 1903 by Jean-Baptiste Franay, a carriage upholsterer, following an apprenticeship with Binder.   It was later taken over by his son, Marius.

Franay dressed prestigious chassis: Bentley, Delage, Hispano-Suiza and Rolls-Royce and the Delahaye Type 135. It was, perhaps, indicative of Franay's parlous financial condition by this time that even for manufacturing the "presidential special" he used, where possible, parts already designed and in production for other manufacturers. The windscreen and bumpers came from a Ford Comète, the wheel trims from a Ford Vendôme, the rear window from a Buick and the tail lights from a Chevrolet.

Franay car body production stopped in late 1955.

Marius Franay was also involved in the film industry as owner of the Industrial Society synchronization and society Cinematographic prints, St. Cloud.

References

External links

Coachbuilders of France
Manufacturing companies established in 1903
Manufacturing companies disestablished in 1955
French companies established in 1903
1955 disestablishments in France